Andrejs Dūda (born 30 October 1981) is a Latvian swimmer, is a two-time Olympian and nine-time NCAA DIII national individual champion in swimming. Duda represented Latvia at the 2004 Summer Olympics in Athens, Greece, and has qualified to compete in the 2008 Summer Olympics. He graduated from Kenyon College in Gambier, Ohio, in 2006 where he was a member of four national championship swimming teams and set a college record with 24 NCAA national event titles.

Duda competed in the 200-meter individual medley and the 100-meter butterfly at the 2008 Summer Olympics in Beijing, China.

References

External links
 
 
 

1981 births
Living people
Kenyon College alumni
Latvian male butterfly swimmers
Latvian male freestyle swimmers
Latvian male medley swimmers
Olympic swimmers of Latvia
Swimmers at the 2004 Summer Olympics
Swimmers at the 2008 Summer Olympics
Sportspeople from Jelgava